Mlađan Janović (born 12 June 1984 in Kotor, SR Montenegro, Yugoslavia) is a Montenegrin water polo player. He currently plays for AN Brescia and he is a long-standing member of the Montenegrin national water polo team. He was part of the Montenegro national team that was crowned European Champion at the 2008 European Championship in Málaga.

Career 
At club level, he played for his local club VK Primorac Kotor and was also a member of Pro Recco, Olympiacos, CN Marseille and RN Savona. Janović was a member of the Montenegro men's national water polo team who finished 4th in the 2008 Games of the XXIX Olympiad in Beijing. This was his first Olympic Games participation. The team was defeated by Hungary in the semifinals and by Serbia in the bronze medal match.

Montenegro won the gold medal at the 2008 Men's European Water Polo Championship in Malaga defeating Serbia 6–5 in the final. He is the younger brother of Nikola Janović. Montenegro finished in 1 place at the 2009 FINA Men's Water Polo World League.

Honours 
CN Marseille
French Championship: 2006–07, 2007–08 
French Cup: 2006–07
VK Primorac Kotor
 LEN Champions League: 2008–09
Montenegrin Cup: 2008–009
Savona
LEN Euro Cup: 2010–11, 2011–12
Pro Recco
Serie A1: 2013–14
Coppa Italia: 2013–14
Galatasaray
Turkish Championship: 2014–15
Olympiacos
Greek Championship: 2016–17

Awards 
 Olympic Tournament 2008 Pekin Team of the Tournament
Serie A1 Top Scorer: 2009–10 with Savona
 European Championship MVP: 2012 Eindhoven
Montenegrin Olympic Committee "Athlete of the Year": 2014
World League Top Scorer: 2018 Budapest

See also
 Montenegro men's Olympic water polo team records and statistics
 List of men's Olympic water polo tournament top goalscorers
 List of World Aquatics Championships medalists in water polo

References

External links
 

Living people
1984 births
Olympiacos Water Polo Club players
Montenegrin male water polo players
Olympic water polo players of Montenegro
Water polo players at the 2008 Summer Olympics
Water polo players at the 2012 Summer Olympics
World Aquatics Championships medalists in water polo
Mediterranean Games bronze medalists for Serbia
Competitors at the 2005 Mediterranean Games
Mediterranean Games medalists in water polo
Galatasaray S.K. (men's water polo) players